Anna Stankus is a circus performer who specialises in hula hoop manipulation whilst also incorporating rhythmic gymnastics and contortion in her acts. She is currently on tour with Cirque du Soleil Kooza for its North American tour. Since first beginning her career in 2007, she has gone on to perform in many productions worldwide including for Cirque du Soleil, Cirque Le Noir, Franco Dragone shows and in various variety shows in her hometown of Las Vegas.

Early life and career 
Anna Stankus was born in west Ukraine in Chernivtsy City on April 9, 1986. At the age of only four-years-old Anna began training with Ukraine's top rhythmic gymnastics academy, the Deriugina School located in Kyiv. During her time there Anna went on to win national and international awards in ribbon, club, ball, rope and hoop events. When she was 18, inspired by videos of Cirque du Soleil artists, Anna began her professional career performing her own dynamic contortion with hoops manipulation act before joining her first Cirque production in 2010.

Since then Anna has traveled the world performing in Japan, China, Dubai, Abu Dhabi, Russia, Switzerland, Germany, Italy, Monte Carlo, Netherlands, Austria, the Philippines and more. She is currently based in Las Vegas, Nevada. She has performed in many popular Las Vegas shows including "V - The Ultimate Variety Show" and 'Best New Show' winner in "Zombie Burlesque". In 2016 Anna told Al Arabiya English, “We’ve done this all our lives…it’s what we do for a living.”

Performances 
 2017-Present, Cirque du Soleil Amaluna, (Touring), Performer
 2016, World of Wonders at Okada Manila, (Philippines), Performer
 2016, Cirque Le Noir - The Dark Side of Cirque Tour, (Abu Dhabi, Dubai, Doha), Performer
 2016, Zombie Burlesque, (Las Vegas), Performer
 2016, V - The Ultimate Variety Show, (Las Vegas), Performer
 2015, Franco Dragone Show, (China), Performer
 2014, Cirque Le Noir - The Dark Side of Cirque, (China), Performer
 2014, Cirque Le Noir - The Dark Side of Cirque, (Atlantic City), Performer
 2014, Cirque Éloize, (Dubai), Performer
 2013-2014, Cirque du Soleil Koozå, (Touring), Performer
 2011-2012, Alexander Kunz Theatre Dinnershow, (Saarbrücken, Saarland), Performer 
 2011, Rock Hard Festival, (Gelsenkirchen, Germany), Performer
 2010, GOP Varieté-Theater, (Hannover), Performer
 2009, Roncalli's Apollo Variete, (Dusseldorf, Germany), Performer
 2008, Absinthe, (New York), Performer

References

External links
Anna Stankus' official website

Living people
Cirque du Soleil performers
21st-century circus performers
Ukrainian gymnasts
Contortionists
Year of birth missing (living people)